The Gheorgheni Skating Rink ("The Gheorgheni Artificial Skating Rink") is a multi-purpose hall in Gheorgheni, Romania. It is frequently used for concerts, indoor sports such as ice hockey, exhibitions and shows. The hall has a seating capacity of 2,000.

External links
Information on arena

Indoor arenas in Romania
Indoor ice hockey venues in Romania
Gheorgheni